Diphenyl disulfide is the chemical compound with the formula (C6H5S)2. This colorless crystalline material is often abbreviated Ph2S2. It is one of the more commonly encountered organic disulfides in organic synthesis. Minor contamination by thiophenol is responsible for the disagreeable odour associated with this compound.

Preparation and structure
Diphenyl disulfide is usually prepared by the oxidation of thiophenol:
 2 PhSH + I2 → Ph2S2 + 2 HI
Hydrogen peroxide can also be used as the oxidant. Ph2S2 is rarely prepared in the laboratory because it is inexpensive, and the precursor has a disagreeable odour.

Like most organic disulfides, the C–S–S–C core of Ph2S2 is non-planar with a dihedral angle approaching 85°.

Reactions
Ph2S2 is mainly used in organic synthesis as a source of the PhS substituent.<ref>{{cite book|author=Byers, J. H.|chapter=Diphenyl Disulfide|title=Encyclopedia of Reagents for Organic Synthesis (Ed: L. Paquette)|year=2004|editor=J. Wiley & Sons|location=New York|doi=10.1002/047084289X|hdl=10261/236866 |isbn=9780471936237 }}.</ref> A typical reaction entails the formation of PhS-substituted carbonyl compounds via the enolate:
RC(O)CHLiR' + Ph2S2 → RC(O)CH(SPh)R' + LiSPh

Reduction
Ph2S2 undergoes reduction, a reaction characteristic of disulfides:
Ph2S2 + 2 M → 2 MSPh (M = Li, Na, K)
Hydride reagents such as sodium borohydride and super hydride can also be used as reductants.
The salts PhSM are sources of the potent nucleophile PhS−. Most alkyl halides, RX (X = halide) convert it to the thioethers with the general formula RSPh. Analogously, protonation of MSPh gives thiophenol:
PhSM + HCl → HSPh + MCl

Halogenation
Ph2S2 reacts with chlorine to give phenylsulfenyl chloride PhSCl (Zincke disulfide cleavage). This species is usually generated and used in situ''. With xenon difluoride, Ph2S2 reacts to give phenylsulfur pentafluoride.

Catalyst for photoisomerization of alkenes
Ph2S2 catalyzes the cis-trans isomerization of alkenes under UV-irradiation.

Oxidation
Oxidation of Ph2S2 with lead(IV) acetate (Pb(OAc)4) in methanol affords the sulfinite ester PhS(O)OMe.

References

Organic disulfides
Phenyl compounds